The Renaissance International School Saigon is a private school in District 7, Ho Chi Minh City, Vietnam. Founded in 2007, the school opened in May 2008, Its study program was based on British style international English medium curriculum, teaching both academic subjects, and creative/performing arts to its 500 plus students. Its teaching staff are mostly from the UK. The four buildings on the school's one-hectare site include facilities such as a 350-seat auditorium, a computer resource centre, gymnasium and 25 m swimming pool.

Curriculum
Renaissance offers programmes from Early Years to secondary curriculum, founded on the International British System. Renaissance includes the Vietnamese curriculum in the programme for Vietnamese pupils, as required by the Ministry of Education. Integrating practices and values from both western and eastern educational systems, the curriculum covers English, Mathematics, Science, History, Geography, Music, Drama, Information and Communication Technology, Health & Physical Education, Art and Design and selected Modern Foreign Languages. The pre-school curriculum (EYFS) assists pupils develop the learning potential with the concept of a "playing" & "activities" learning style. The programme offers opportunities for hands-on experiences. The primary curriculum incorporates the International Primary Curriculum (IPC) which is delivered in English.

The secondary curriculum includes three Key Stages:
 At Key Stage 3 (age 11–14: years 7–9), pupils study and adapt the British National Curriculum learning style through a wide range of subjects. Pupils are also taught to grow a sense of citizenship and community and learn to organise their time. The schedule also gives Vietnamese pupils the opportunity to study their mother-tongue language and improve their overall literacy skills.
 During Key Stage 4 (age 14–16: years 10–11), pupils study for the International General Certificate of Secondary Education, an internationally recognised qualification.
 Since April 2009, for Key Stage 5 (age 17–18: years 12–13), the school has been delivering the International Baccalaureate Diploma Programme, an educational programme that provides an internationally accepted qualification for entry into higher education.

References

External links

International schools in Vietnam
International schools in Ho Chi Minh City
Schools in Ho Chi Minh City